The Argentine Paralympic Committee (COPAR;  – COPAR) is the private, non-profit organization representing Argentine Paralympic athletes in the International Paralympic Committee (IPC), the Parapan American Games and the South American Para Games. It is the governing body of Argentine Paralympic sport.

See also
Argentina at the Paralympics
Argentine Olympic Committee

References

External links
Official website

National Paralympic Committees
Paralympic
Argentina at the Paralympics
Sports organizations established in 2004
2004 establishments in Argentina